Kids vs Monsters is a 2015 American fantasy comedy film that was directed by Sultan Saeed Al Darmaki and is his directorial debut. The film was released on video on demand on September 29, 2015.

Synopsis
The film centers around six children that have been sent to a strange, mysterious house by their wealthy parents, who feel that their children pose more of a burden than a blessing. While in the house they will face seven monsters, each of which are intent on battling the children.

Cast
Elaine Hendrix as Mary
Keith David as Barry
Daniel David Stewart as Oliver Gingerfield
Malcolm McDowell as Boss Monster
Francesca Eastwood as Candy
Lance Henriksen as Heinrich
Armand Assante as Damian
Anna Akana as Daisy
Adrian Paul as Greg Lovett
Christopher Atkins as Charles
Mary Birdsong as Maxine
Richard Moll as Butler
Lee Purcell as Francine Gingerfield
Michael Bailey Smith as Mr. Beet
Candace Elaine as Cecilia Sealskin
Sydney Endicott as Molly Sealskin
Bridger Zadina as David

Reception
Commonsensemedia panned the film, writing "Tedious, awful horror-comedy for kids is unwatchable."
Starpulse tried to be more upbeat, stating that they enjoyed the film despite it appearing to be "set up for failure" and that "Whether it’s the out of nowhere animated introductions of the cavalcade of creatures, the presence of icons like Malcolm McDowell, Lance Henriksen and especially the ever-underused and scene-stealing Richard Moll, or just the sheer laughs that come out of obtuse situations and embarrassing dialogue, there’s an engaging quality to the film that can’t just be ignored."

References

External links
 
 
 

2015 films
American children's comedy films
American comedy horror films
2015 directorial debut films
2010s English-language films
2010s American films